The designation No. 69 Squadron has been used by the Royal Air Force for two quite different units.

No. 3 Squadron, Australian Flying Corps was formed at Point Cook, Victoria, Australia in 1916. To avoid confusion with No. 3 Squadron, RFC, it was known to the British military as "No. 69 Squadron RFC", although this terminology was never accepted by the squadron or the Australian Imperial Force.

The squadron was "re-formed" on 10 January 1941 during World War II, when No. 431 (General Reconnaissance) Flight RAF, briefly re-designated as No. 1431 Flight RAF. on Malta became No. 69 Squadron.  It carried out strategic reconnaissance missions mainly using Martin Marylands until May 1942 when Spitfires began to carry out all reconnaissance missions. These were later supplemented by Martin Baltimores for shipping reconnaissance and anti-submarine patrols until April 1944 when the Squadron returned to the UK.

No. 69 re-assembled at RAF Northolt on 5 May 1944 as part of No. 34 Wing of the Second Tactical Air Force equipped with Vickers Wellington XIIIs for night reconnaissance duties, beginning operations on the eve of D-Day, using flares to locate enemy troop movements. In September the Squadron moved to France and Belgium until 7 May 1945, the Squadron disbanding on 7 August 1945.

On 8 August 1945, 613 Squadron at Cambrai-Epinoy, France, was renumbered No. 69 Squadron, flying Mosquito FB.VI fighter-bombers until it was again disbanded on 31 March 1946. The next day, 180 Squadron was renumbered No. 69 at Wahn again equipped with Mosquito light bombers until again disbanded on 6 November 1947.

The squadron flew from RAF Gutersloh in Germany briefly from 1954. No. 69 had been reformed on 5 May 1954 at RAF Laarbruch as a Canberra reconnaissance unit and remained in Germany until renumbered 39 Squadron on 1 July 1958.

See also
List of Royal Air Force aircraft squadrons

References

Bibliography

External links

069 Squadron
Aircraft squadrons of the Royal Air Force in World War II
Reconnaissance units and formations of the Royal Air Force